Sericominolia is a genus of sea snails, marine gastropod mollusks in the family Trochidae, the top snails.

Species
Species within the genus Sericominolia include:
 Sericominolia vernicosa (Gould, 1861)
Species brought into synonymy
 Sericominolia stearnsii (Pilsbry, 1895): synonym of Ethminolia stearnsii (Pilsbry, 1895)

References

 Poppe, G.T., S.P. Tagaro and H. Dekker 2006 The Seguenziidae, Chilodontidae, Trochidae, Calliostomatiidae & Solariellidae of the Philippine Islands with the description of 1 new genus, 2 new subgenus, 70 new species and 1 new subspecies. Visaya Supplement 2. Conchology, Inc

External links

 
Trochidae
Gastropod genera